The Summer Knows is an album by Art Farmer recorded in 1976 and originally released on the Japanese East Wind label.

Reception

Scott Yanow of AllMusic states, "The material (which includes such tunes as 'Alfie,' 'When I Fall in Love' and 'I Should Care') is given lyrical treatment by these masterful players on this ballad-dominated date."

Track listing
 "The Summer Knows" (Alan and Marilyn Bergman, Michel Legrand) – 7:42
 "Manhã de Carnaval" (Luiz Bonfá, Antônio Maria) – 5:24
 "Alfie" (Burt Bacharach, Hal David) – 4:55
 "When I Fall in Love" (Edward Heyman, Victor Young) – 6:13
 "Ditty" (Art Farmer) – 4:45
 "I Should Care" (Sammy Cahn, Axel Stordahl, Paul Weston) – 5:30

Personnel
Art Farmer – flugelhorn
Cedar Walton – piano
Sam Jones – bass
Billy Higgins – drums

References 

East Wind Records albums
Art Farmer albums
1977 albums